Atlantik is a Trinidadian soca band that was headlined by singers Burton Toney and Destra. They are known for their hits "All Aboard" and "Oh Suzanna". The band's style mixes ballads, chutney, folk, pop, R&B, reggae, soca, and worldbeat genres, and is one of the more prominent bands in Trinidad and Tobago.

Discography

Albums
Caribbean Party (1991), JW Productions
Good Music To Dance (1992), JW Productions
Hot Caribbean Music (1993), JW Productions
Hot & Spicy (1997), JW Productions
360 Degrees Soca (1998), JW Productions
Making Waves (1999), JW Productions
Hard As Steel (2000), JW Productions
Breakin All the Rules (2001), JW Productions 
Full Speed Ahead (2002), JW Productions

References

Trinidad and Tobago musical groups
Soca musical groups